Kirk Glacier is a tributary glacier draining southeast along the south side of Fischer Ridge into Ironside Glacier, in the Admiralty Mountains of Victoria Land, Antarctica. It was mapped by the United States Geological Survey from surveys and U.S. Navy air photos, 1960–64, and was named by the Advisory Committee on Antarctic Names for Edward Kirk, U.S. Navy, a commissaryman at McMurdo Station, 1967.

References

Glaciers of Borchgrevink Coast